
Year 156 BC was a year of the pre-Julian Roman calendar. At the time it was known as the Year of the Consulship of Lupus and Figulus (or, less frequently, year 598 Ab urbe condita) and the Eighth Year of Houyuan. The denomination 156 BC for this year has been used since the early medieval period, when the Anno Domini calendar era became the prevalent method in Europe for naming years.

Events 
 By place 

 Roman Republic 
 The first Dalmatian war begins.

Deaths

References